Thomsen may refer to:

Surname
Thomsen

Other uses
 Thomsen River, Northwest Territories, Canada